The Old House is a Grade II listed public house at Redwell Lane, Ightham Common, Kent TN15 9EE.

It is on the Campaign for Real Ale's National Inventory of Historic Pub Interiors.

It dates to the 17th century.

References

Grade II listed pubs in Kent
National Inventory Pubs